Capvest Limited is a European investment firm headquartered in London, United Kingdom and is a mid-market private equity firm specialising in sectors which are characterised by non-discretionary demand.

Its investments include FoodVest, Mater, Punch Taverns, RenoNorden, Scandi Standard, Scandza, United Coffee, Vaasan & Vaasan and Young's Bluecrest.

History
In 1999, CapVest Associates LLP was founded in London, United Kingdom.

In May 2021 the firm sold Valeo Foods to Bain Capital for an estimated £1.5 billion.

in April 2022, CapVest acquired the Michigan-based snacks and treats producer, Second Nature Brands.

References

Private equity and venture capital investors
Financial services in the Republic of Ireland